Novosil is a town and the administrative center of Novosilsky District in Oryol Oblast, Russia, located on the right bank of the Zusha River  east of Oryol, the administrative center of the oblast. Population:

History
It was first mentioned in 1155 as a fortress called Itil and was the seat of a branch of the Rurik dynasty in the Middle Ages. Town rights were granted to Novosil in 1777. During World War II, Novosil was occupied by the German Army from November 13 to December 27, 1941.

Administrative and municipal status
Within the framework of administrative divisions, Novosil serves as the administrative center of Novosilsky District. As an administrative division, it is incorporated within Novosilsky District as the town of district significance of Novosil. As a municipal division, the town of district significance of Novosil is incorporated within Novosilsky Municipal District as Novosil Urban Settlement.

Notable residents 

Maya Dmitrievna Koveshnikova (1926–2013), landscape painter
Slava Polunin (born 1950), performance artist

References

Notes

Sources

Cities and towns in Oryol Oblast
Novosilsky Uyezd